Julia Peterkin (October 31, 1880 – August 10, 1961) was an American author from South Carolina. In 1929 she won the Pulitzer Prize for Novel/Literature for her novel Scarlet Sister Mary. She wrote several novels about the plantation South, especially the Gullah people of the Lowcountry. She was one of the few white authors who wrote about the African-American experience.

Life and career 
Julia Mood was born in Laurens County, South Carolina. Her father was a physician, and she was the third of his four children. Her mother died soon after her birth, and her father later married Janie Brogdon. Janie was the mother of Henry Ashleigh Mood, Julia's half-brother and her father's fourth child. He became a doctor.

In 1896, at age 16, Julia Mood graduated from Converse College in Spartanburg, South Carolina; she earned her master's degree there a year later. She taught at the public school in Fort Motte, South Carolina for a few years, then married William George Peterkin in 1903. He was a planter who owned Lang Syne, a  cotton plantation near Fort Motte.

She began writing short stories, inspired by the everyday life and management of the plantation. She was described as audacious as well as gracious by Robeson (1995). Peterkin sent highly assertive letters to people she did not know and had never met. For example, she wrote to authors Carl Sandburg and H.L. Mencken, and included samples of her writing about the Gullah culture of coastal South Carolina. Living chiefly on the plantation, she invited Sandburg, Mencken, and other prominent people to the plantation.

Sandburg, who lived within a day's travel in Flat Rock, North Carolina, made a visit. Although Mencken did not visit, he became Peterkin's literary agent in her early career, a possible testament to her persuasive letters. Eventually, Mencken led her to Alfred Knopf, who published Green Thursday, her first book, in 1924.

In addition to a number of subsequent novels, her short stories were published in magazines and newspaper throughout her career. Peterkin was among the few white authors to specialize in the African-American experience.

She won a Pulitzer Prize in 1929 for her novel Scarlet Sister Mary. Dr. Richard S. Burton, the chairperson of Pulitzer's fiction-literature jury, recommended that the first prize go to the novel Victim and Victor by John Rathbone Oliver. The School of Journalism chose Peterkin's book. Burton resigned from the jury.

The book aroused some controversy in the South. The public library in the small town of Gaffney, South Carolina classified it as obscene and banned it. However, The Gaffney Ledger published the complete book in serial form.

Peterkin performed as an actress, playing the main character in Ibsen's Hedda Gabler at the Town Theatre in Columbia, South Carolina, beginning in February 1932.

In 1933, Peterkin was contacted by Caroline Pafford Miller of Baxley, Georgia. Miller was seeking a publisher for her first novel Lamb in His Bosom, and hoped to enlist Peterkin's help. Peterkin forwarded Miller's name and manuscript to her publisher. In 1933, Harper released Lamb in His Bosom. Miller won the Pulitzer Prize for the novel in 1934.

Legacy 
 In 1998, the Department of English and Creative Writing at her alma mater Converse College established The Julia Peterkin Award for poetry, open to everyone.

Works
 Green Thursday: Stories, New York: Alfred Knopf, 1924.
 Black April, Indianapolis: Bobbs Merrill, 1927.
 Scarlet Sister Mary, Indianapolis: Bobbs-Merrill, 1928, awarded the Pulitzer Prize. It was adapted as a play of the same name, opening on Broadway in 1930, with Ethel Barrymore.
 Bright Skin, Indianapolis: Bobbs Merrill, 1932
 Roll, Jordan, Roll, New York, R.O. Ballou, 1933, with photographic studies of the Gullah by Doris Ulmann
 A Plantation Christmas, Boston and New York, Houghton Mifflin, 1934

Julia Peterkin used the Gullah language in many of her novels and stories. Writer and anthropologist Zora Neale Hurston used Negro dialect in her novels, contrary to the practice of the other writers in the Harlem Renaissance. Some objected in print to such conventions. Hurston wrote that she had met Peterkin and began a correspondence,, but no letters between them have been found.

Awards
 1925, O. Henry Award for Best Short Story, "Maum Lou"
 1929, Pulitzer Prize for Fiction, Scarlet Sister Mary
 1930, O. Henry Award for Best Short Story, "The Diamond Ring"

See also

 South Carolina literature

Notes

References
 "Burton Quits Jury on Pulitzer Award", The New York Times, May 17, 1929, p. 12.
 "Julia Peterkin Wins Ovation as Actress; Novelist's Debut in Title Role of 'Hedda Gabler' Draws Record Advance Sale in Columbia, S.C.", The New York Times, February 27, 1932, p. 22.
 "Julia Peterkin, novelist, Was 80; Author of the Pulitzer Prize winning 'Scarlet Sister Mary' Dies", The New York Times, August 11, 1961, p. 23.
 Durham, Frank (1970). The Collected Short Stories of Julia Peterkin, Columbia, S.C.: University of South Carolina Press. 
 Robeson, Elizabeth (November 1995). "The Ambiguity of Julia Peterkin", The Journal of Southern History, vol. LXI, no. 4, pp. 761–786.

External links
 
 
 Dramatized audio version of The Merry-Go-Round (1921 short story by Peterkin)
 First Edition of Scarlet Sister Mary (1929 Pulitzer Prize for Fiction)
 

1880 births
1961 deaths
20th-century American novelists
20th-century American women writers
American women novelists
Burials in South Carolina
Charleston Renaissance
Converse University alumni
Daughters of the American Revolution people
Novelists from South Carolina
People from Laurens County, South Carolina
Pulitzer Prize for the Novel winners